The Lima–Van Wert–Wapakoneta Combined Statistical Area (CSA) is made up of three counties in Northwest Ohio. The Lima Metropolitan Statistical Area and two Micropolitan Statistical Areas – Van Wert and Wapakoneta, are components of the CSA. As of the 2000 Census, the CSA had a population of 184,743 (though a July 1, 2009 estimate placed the population at 179,552).

Counties
Allen
Auglaize
Van Wert

Communities

Cities
Delphos
Lima (Principal city)
Saint Marys
Van Wert (Principal city)
Wapakoneta (Principal city)

Villages

Unincorporated places

Townships

Allen County

Auglaize County

Van Wert County

Demographics
As of the census of 2000, there were 184,743 people, 69,609 households, and 49,333 families residing within the CSA. The racial makeup of the CSA was 90.28% White, 7.34% African American, 0.19% Native American, 0.46% Asian, 0.01% Pacific Islander, 0.54% from other races, and 1.19% from two or more races. Hispanic or Latino of any race were 1.25% of the population.

The median income for a household in the CSA was $39,971, and the median income for a family was $47,083. Males had a median income of $34,982 versus $23,735 for females. The per capita income for the CSA was $18,466.

See also
Ohio census statistical areas

References

External links
Map, Cleveland State University (PDF)

Allen County, Ohio
Auglaize County, Ohio
Van Wert County, Ohio
Lima, Ohio
Combined statistical areas of the United States